Grasslands National Park is a Canadian national park located near the village of Val Marie, Saskatchewan, and one of 44 national parks and park reserves in Canada's national park system (though one of only two in Saskatchewan itself). This national park is north of the U.S. state of Montana and lies adjacent to the international boundary.

The park was established in 1981. Prior to this the province's only national park was Prince Albert National Park. Grasslands annually receives about 12,000 visitors.

Grasslands National Park represents the Prairie Grasslands natural region, protecting one of the nation's few remaining areas of undisturbed dry mixed-grass/shortgrass prairie grassland. The park is located in the World Wildlife Fund-defined Northern short grasslands ecoregion, which spans much of southern Saskatchewan, southern Alberta, and the northern Great Plains states in the US. The unique landscape and harsh, semi-arid climate provide niches for several adapted plants and animals. The park and surrounding area house the country's only black-tailed prairie dog colonies. Fauna found in the park include bison, pronghorns, greater sage-grouses, ring-necked pheasants, burrowing owls, coyotes, ferruginous hawks, swift foxes, prairie rattlesnakes, black-footed ferrets, eastern yellow-bellied racers, and greater short-horned lizards. Flora includes blue grama grass, needlegrass, plains cottonwood and silver sagebrush.

History 

Erosion by glacial meltwater formed many of the park's characteristic features. Highlights of the park's geological landscape include the Frenchman River Valley, the Seventy Mile Butte, and the badlands of Rock Creek.

In 1874, Sir George Mercer Dawson discovered Western Canada's first dinosaur remains in the Killdeer Badlands during the International Boundary Survey. Later, in 1877, Sitting Bull took refuge in the area with around 5,000 Sioux after the defeat of General Custer at the Battle of Little Bighorn.

Grasslands National Park is on the traditional territory of the Blackfoot (Niitsítapi) people of the Canadian and American plains and is Treaty 4 land. A 2022 agreement between the Métis Nation - Saskatchewan and Parks Canada provides for the transfer of 24 bison.

West and East Blocks 

The West Block of the park is located one hour south of Swift Current, and the main visitor reception centre is located in the town of Val Marie. Highlights of the West Block include the Frenchman River Valley, a herd of over 300 plains bison as well as prairie dog colonies. Frenchman Valley Campground offers visitors serviced camping sites, teepee camping, and a cook shelter. Backcountry camping is also available. The West Block is located in Census Division No. 4.

The East Block of the park is located about an hour's drive south of Assiniboia on the south side of the Wood Mountain Hills in Census Division No. 3. The interpretive centre is in the McGowan House at the new Rock Creek Campground and the information centre is at the museum in Wood Mountain Regional Park. The East Block is more of a wilderness area but has views of the badlands of Rock Creek, the Cretaceous–Paleogene boundary, and prairie skies. A one-lane,  parkway traverses the Rock Creek Badlands. The East Block contains the Grasslands National Park (east) (SK 023) Important Bird Area.
 
In 2006, plains bison from Elk Island National Park in Alberta were reintroduced to Grasslands. By 2015 the herd had grown from the original 71 animals to over 300. The herd is maintained on a  section in the park's West Block. On 2 October 2009, in a ceremony at Belza House, the park was declared a dark-sky preserve, and a small population of black-footed ferrets was reintroduced into the prairie dog towns after a 70-year absence. Improved night-lighting practices under the dark-sky agreement ensure that the park remains dark at night, preserving a natural environment for all nocturnal wildlife.

See also
List of National Parks of Canada
List of protected areas of Saskatchewan
List of protected grasslands of North America
Tourism in Saskatchewan

References

External links 

The Prairie Learning Centre

Grasslands National Park  - Encyclopedia of Saskatchewan

Grasslands of Canada
National parks in Saskatchewan
Protected areas established in 1981
Dark-sky preserves in Canada
Important Bird Areas of Saskatchewan
1981 establishments in Saskatchewan